Pudhu Yugam can refer to two Tamil language films.

 Pudhu Yugam (1954 film), a film starring S. A. Natarajan, P. V. Narasimha Bharathi and Krishna Kumari
 Pudhu Yugam (1985 film), a film starring Sivakumar and Vijayakanth